Superman/Shazam: First Thunder is a 2006 comic book mini-series published by DC Comics, written by Judd Winick and art by Joshua Middleton.

The story recounts the first meeting between two DC superheroes, Superman and Shazam. Contrary to the usual popular stereotype, the mini-series shows how the superheroes quickly become loyal allies whose individual differences complement each other.

Plot
Set at the beginning of what the Wizard Shazam calls "the second age of the great heroes", after the debut of the Man of Steel, Batman and Shazam but before the coming of Wonder Woman, the Flash and Green Lantern, the story begins with Superman traveling to Fawcett City in pursuit of a group of criminals who have just robbed a museum from Metropolis and used magic against him. Upon arriving in Fawcett, he finds Shazam fighting the same group of thieves. Together Superman and Shazam dispatch a pair of monsters in a battle where Superman is impressed at how this new hero is able to ward off magic attacks that he himself is defenseless against; Shazam himself is a bit envious of Superman's additional vision and breath-based powers. Afterward, they take a break from crime fighting to chat at Mount Everest, where they discuss their powers and professional lives as superheroes. Superman breaks off the more personal aspects of the conversation, remarking that he prefers to keep his two lives entirely separate. Shazam says he understands, but that he thinks "it kind of stinks". Afterward, they continue working together to thwart the villains Lord Sabbac (who the museum-robbing gang had been attempting to summon all along) and Eclipso. At the end, Superman notes he is glad to have an ally in Shazam who is better suited to battling the supernatural than he would ever be.

In a separate subplot, Shazam nemesis, Dr. Thaddeus Sivana, has contacted his business rival Lex Luthor and asked for assistance in destroying Shazam. In exchange for Sivana selling Luthor back shares of LexCorp he'd been secretly buying, Luthor gives Sivana a man named Spec, a metahuman tracker-for-hire who eventually discovers that Shazam is the alter ego of 11-year-old Billy Batson. After learning this, Sivana sends a heavily armed hit men to the subway where the orphaned Billy is living with orders to kill him. Calling upon the power of SHAZAM, Shazam dispatches his would be killers, but caught in the crossfire is Billy's best friend, Scott Okum; Shazam rushes Scott to the hospital, but they are unable to save him.

When Fawcett City police are unsuccessful in interrogating one of the killers (some sort of hired gun who seems to have no identity), Shazam storms into the police department, bursts into the interrogating room and, despite attempts by police to restrain him, assaults the suspect and threatens to kill him (by crushing his skull then displaying his corpse to his partners down in lock up) if he does not reveal who sent them to attack him. The killer buckles and reveals his employer as Doctor Sivana. Thirsting for revenge, Shazam travels to Sivana's office building, shatters the top floor and nearly chokes Sivana to death, but he can't bring himself to kill Sivana, even though he knows Sivana will attack him again, and leaves.

Back in Metropolis, Clark Kent, having just published an article on the encounter of Superman and Shazam, learns of Shazam's "rampage" in Fawcett City, and confronts Shazam at Mount Everest, demanding an explanation for his actions. The tearful, guilt-ridden Shazam tells Superman why he did what he did, explaining that Scott was his best friend. Echoing Shazam's words, an obviously-dubious Superman returns an accusing stare and a fierce snarl. Realizing how strange that this sounds (and the Man of Steel wants a response...right now), Shazam reveals his true identity, calling upon the power of SHAZAM to transform him back to Billy Batson, commenting that it might be too dangerous to still be "Billy". "Who did this to you?" is Superman's demanding reaction.

Superman confronts Shazam and berates him for bestowing the power and responsibility of Shazam upon an 11-year-old boy; stating that the biggest concerns of boys his age should be "homework assignments and school yard crushes — not if their best friends are going to be murdered by assassins!"  Bearing such destinies, he snaps, should only be chosen by adults, and Billy "is just a little boy!" The Wizard sadly remarks that Billy is indeed a child, ".. a boy who could use... guidance". Superman's expression softens to one of sadness (as the reality of the situation hits home).

The scene changes to Billy's new home, an abandoned apartment building, and Superman, in his guise as Clark Kent, drops by for a visit (subtly using his X-ray vision to find Billy before even entering the building). Billy initially thinks that Kent is from social services, but then Kent reveals himself to be Superman, sits down next to Billy and tells him: "My real name is Clark". This seems to imply that Superman has agreed to become a mentor to Shazam.

Reception
The book was met with positive reception. The Common Voice said that while "it is doubtful Superman/Shazam will be remembered as a graphic novel classic...fans will nevertheless get a kick out of seeing these legends team up". Phillip Hayes of Paperback Reader gave the book an A−, saying "if you want a laid-back adventure, try this book out. It is one of the best Captain Marvel stories I’ve had the honor of reading". Newsarama praised the story also.

In other media 
The series was loosely adapted in the 2010 film Superman/Shazam!: The Return of Black Adam.

Collected editions
The series was collected as a trade paperback:
 Superman/Shazam: First Thunder (128 pages, DC Comics, May 2006, Titan Books, August 2006)

References

External links

2005 comics debuts
Superman titles
Captain Marvel (DC Comics)
Team-up comics